The Y-Bridge is an old highway bridge over the James River located at Galena, Stone County, Missouri, and opened in 1927.  This three-way bridge is named the Y-Bridge because it is shaped like the letter "Y".  The bridge is such that (going east), one could then either head north or south upon reaching the east end, where the highway was between a steep bluff on the east and the river on the west.  It was built to accommodate Routes 13 and 44, now Routes 413 and 248.

The bridge is now closed to vehicles and has been placed on the National Register of Historic Places.  A newer bridge to the north carries traffic over the river.

References

See also
 Margaret Bridge

Road bridges on the National Register of Historic Places in Missouri
Former road bridges in the United States
Pedestrian bridges in Missouri
Buildings and structures in Stone County, Missouri
Three-way bridges
National Register of Historic Places in Stone County, Missouri
1926 establishments in Missouri
Bridges completed in 1926
Open-spandrel deck arch bridges in the United States